Attila Kökény (born 20 April 1975, Budapest) is a Hungarian singer, most notable for coming second in the fifth season of Megasztár and for his participation in A Dal.

Career
Kökény began singing in 2000. He has been playing on boats and in night bars for years. He has been playing piano for 20 years. He writes his songs. He was in a band with Kálmán Nyári named FAIN. He came second in the fifth season of Megasztár, only behind winner Reni Tolvai.

In 2012, Kökény was the first ever participant in A Dal, the Hungarian national selection process for the Eurovision Song Contest, performing first in the first semi-final of A Dal 2012, in a duet with Tamara Bencsik with the song Állítsd Meg Az Időt!. They ranked 8th in the semi-final and did not advance to the final. On 6 December 2017, it was announced that he will compete in the 2018 edition of A Dal, for the Eurovision Song Contest 2018 in Lisbon, Portugal with the song Életre kel, in a trio with Nikoletta Szőke and Róbert Szakcsi Lakatos. They were eliminated in the semi-finals.

He is married and the father of three children.

Awards
 Magyar Toleranciadíj (2013)
 Jótékonysági Díj (2015)

Discography 
 Nincs semmi másom (2011) Universal/Zebra
 Mese az álomról (2012)
 Hol az a perc (2014) Mistral
 Karácsonyi dalok (2015) Mistral
 Elmegyek – Válogatás Máté Péter dalaiból (2016) Mistral

References

External links
 Tolvai Renáta az Év hangja
 Megasztár 5
 Kökény Attila

1975 births
Living people
Musicians from Budapest
21st-century Hungarian male singers